Betrayal is a novel by Danielle Steel, published by Delacorte Press in July 2012. The book is Steel's eighty-sixth novel, and (including non-fiction and children's books) her 104th book overall.  It reached number 3 in the New York Times hardback fiction bestsellers chart. It is also available in audio book, read by Renee Raudman.

Plot
This novel tells the story of film director, Tallie Jones, a Hollywood legend who experienced betrayals from the people she least expects.

Tallie Jones is 39 years old. She is a successful director with critically acclaimed films and commercially successful productions. She has great and fabulous relationships with her aging father and lawyer, Sam Jones; her daughter in college, Maxfield; her boyfriend of four years and film producer, Hunter Lloyd; and finally, her personal assistant of seventeen years and best friend since film school, the glamorous Brigitte Parker. In short, she lives in a perfect world of success.

But one day, it was called to her attention by her long-time accountant, Victor Carson that she is losing money without her knowledge from her financial records. Apparently, she is losing $25,000 monthly for the last three years. When Tallie finds out, she is completely at lost on how this has been happening since she fully trust that her well-ordered personal assistant, Brigitte takes care of everything. But nevertheless, Victor tells her to go look after it for somebody might be embezzling money from her. She confronts Brigitte with regards to this matter and tells her that her boyfriend, Hunt has been asking her for cash for the last three years. She also tells Tallie that Hunt has been cheating on her as he is involved with another woman for a year and that it took her many years to tell her the truth because she was protective of her relationship and does not intend to ruin the current happiness that she has felt for four years with Hunt.

Tallie was extremely disappointed upon knowing it. She also felt that both Hunt and Brigitte have never been truthful to her. She also was disappointed the dishonesty and insincerity that Hunt have shown her. She then hires a private investigator to verify the accuracy of what Brigitte told her. After a few days, the private investigator does report to her that indeed her boyfriend has been involved with a woman named Alice Morrisey for a year now and that the woman is expecting a child. Also, it was also known that Hunt and Brigitte have been having an affair for three years before Alice came into the picture. Upon receiving the pictures, she was deeply hurt and confronts him about it at home. Hunt admits of the relationship and tells her that he is about to marry Alice. When she asked him to leave the other woman, he rejects the idea and leaves the house instead.

As for the money that she is losing, Tallie hires special agent from the FBI named Jim Kingston to investigate the matter. After many weeks of investigation, it was apparent that it was not Hunt that was taking away her money as Brigitte told her. Instead, it was her personal assistant herself who is involved in the embezzlement. After evidence have been gathered, she makes the decision to fire her personal assistant. Things get worse as Brigitte shoots Hunt and kills him in the process. Her personal assistant was arrested and brought into prison to be locked up for eighteen years.

As Tallie experiences these betrayals, her father died of natural process. She tries to recover from these negative events that took place and Jim helps her during the healing process. Romance blossoms between the two and they end up marrying each other.

Reception
Publishers Weekly called it "absurd" and attacked its cardboard characters, suggesting it was strictly for fans of her earlier work. The Star (Malaysia) found it over-long and repetitive.  The Bangkok Post acknowledged its lack of literary value but called it a good read.

References

External links
Official author website

2012 American novels
American romance novels

Hollywood novels
Novels by Danielle Steel
Novels set in Palm Springs, California
Delacorte Press books